Reba Monica John (born 4 February 1994) is an Indian actress and model who works prominently in  Malayalam language films.

Early life and personal life 

Reba Monica John was born on 4 February 1994 into a Malayalee family in Bangalore. She has a Bachelor's and master's degree in chemistry from Christ University, Bangalore. She is the cousin of Indian-American Actor Anu Emmanuel. She married Joemon Joseph in 2022.

Career 
Before essaying a guest role in the film, she was seen in a few advertisements in which Dhatri Hair Oil was one of her notable works. In 2013, she won the 2nd runner-up title of the reality series Midukki, which launched on Mazhavil Manorama.

In 2016, she made her debut in the Malayalam film industry through Jacobinte Swargarajyam, which is directed by Vineeth Sreenivasan. She essayed the role of "Chippy", the female guest role of the film, co-starring with Nivin Pauly. movie was a big success in the box office and her second movie with Neeraj Madhav, the movie Paippine Chuvattile Pranayam, also a hit in the box office, directed by Domin d'Silva with music by Bijibal.

Filmography

Other works

Music video

References

External links
 

Living people
Indian film actresses
Actresses from Kochi
Actresses in Malayalam cinema
21st-century Indian actresses
Actresses in Malayalam television
Indian television actresses
1994 births
Christ University alumni
Actresses in Tamil cinema
Actresses in Kannada cinema